Jerome Soltan (September 16, 1929 – December 15, 2010) was an American architect who designed residential, commercial, and religious buildings primarily on Chicago's North Side and north suburbs. He is most well known as the originator of the Four Plus One, an apartment building type consisting of four stories above parking.

Soltan graduated from the University of Illinois in 1952, after which he worked as a draftsman for Henry L. Newhouse and Karl Newhouse before opening his own firm in 1955. Some of his notable works include the Skokie Valley Traditional Synagogue, Mission Hills Country Club (Northbrook), 7247 N. Western, 2640 W. Touhy, and 6611 N. Sheridan.

Soltan was married to his wife Renee and together they raised three daughters; Cherie, Michele and Suzie.  Jerry also had six grandkids.  Jerry enjoyed playing gin rummy and golf.

References

External links 
 Chicago Tribune Obituary
 Forgotten Chicago - Defining the Four Plus One
 A Chicago Sojourn - Painted concrete artistry of Jerome Soltan
 Chicago's Four Plus One
 Skokie Valley Agudath Jacob Synagogue

1929 births
2010 deaths
Artists from Chicago
20th-century American architects